Charlottesville–Albemarle Airport  is eight miles north of Charlottesville, in Albemarle County, Virginia, United States. It opened in 1955 and serves the Charlottesville/Albemarle region with non-stop flights to five major cities  on three airlines' subsidiaries. CHO underwent major construction in summer 2006; an 800-foot runway extension began in summer 2010 and was completed in December 2012.

The Federal Aviation Administration (FAA) National Plan of Integrated Airport Systems for 2021–2025 categorized it as a non-hub primary commercial service facility. Federal Aviation Administration records say it had 274,767 passenger boardings (enplanements) in calendar year 2015 and 295,930 in 2016. The Charlottesville Albemarle Airport Authority says there were 628,611 total passengers (enplaned and deplaned) in fiscal year 2017.

Piedmont Airlines DC-3s arrived in 1955; the first jets were Piedmont 727s in 1967 (the runway was extended from 4661 ft to 6000 ft at about that time).

As of September 2022, the airport was served by ERJ-145, E170, E175, CRJ-200, CRJ-700, CRJ-900 and 717 aircraft.

Facilities
The airport covers 710 acres (287 ha) at an elevation of 640 feet (195 m).

The airport has a  terminal with on-site rental cars (Enterprise, Avis, Budget, & National), ground transportation.

Food Service is available through Tailwind Concessions under the brands Turbo Grill, Radar Bar, and Copilot Coffee. There is a gift shop selling grab and go food and local gifts on the second level at Gate 5.

General aviation facilities include an executive terminal offering a full-service by the fixed-base operator, Signature Flight Support, flight schools, emergency medical transportation provided by the UVA Hospital's Pegasus service and aircraft charter firms.

In 2019 the airport opened "The Founders Lounge", which is a quiet lounge area at gate 5. Access is available to anyone who purchases a day pass for a nominal fee. It features comfortable seating, conference room, tables, and decor from local artists and craftsman showcasing the Charlottesville area. Complementary beverages and snacks are also included. 

In 2020 the airport had 90,555 aircraft operations, average 248 per day: 67% general aviation, 19% air taxi, 11% military, and 3% airline. In January 2022, 56 aircraft were based at this airport: 40 single-engine,  6 jet, 1 helicopter, and 1 ultralight.

Airlines and destinations

Passenger

Statistics

Top routes

Carrier shares

Accidents and incidents
Piedmont Airlines Flight 349 crashed on October 30, 1959 into Bucks Elbow Mountain while attempting to land at this airport, killing 26 of 27 people on board.

The White Oak

The tree is the second largest white oak in Virginia, standing 75 feet tall with an 85-foot crown. It is located on the southernmost point of airport property along the approach to Runway 3. It is believed to be between 250 and 300 years old. It is included in Virginia Tech's Virginia Big Tree Database and also the Remarkable Trees of Virginia Program.

Access to the tree is restricted as it is in a secure section of the airport, but visits can be scheduled on the airport's website.

References

External links

 Charlottesville–Albemarle Airport, official website
 Aerial image as of April 1994 from USGS The National Map
 
 
Virginia Tech's Virginia Big Tree Database, White Oak Tree information

Airports in Virginia
Buildings and structures in Albemarle County, Virginia
Transportation in Albemarle County, Virginia
Transportation in Charlottesville, Virginia